Oplosia cinerea is a species of beetle in the family Cerambycidae. It was described by Mulsant in 1839.

References

Acanthoderini
Beetles described in 1839